The Greek National Road Race Championships have been held since 2000.

Men

Men Elite

Under 23

Women

Women Elite

See also
Greek National Time Trial Championships
National Road Cycling Championships

References

National road cycling championships
Cycle races in Greece
Recurring sporting events established in 2000
2000 establishments in Greece
Cycling